Hanifa (حنيفة) is an Arabic given name, the feminine form of Hanif, which means "incline" (to the right religion, i.e. Islam). It may refer to:

 Abu Hanifa, founder of Hanafi school of jurisprudence
 V. M. C. Haneefa, Indian actor
 Hənifə, Azerbaijan
 Hanifa Deen, Australian writer
 Hanifa Yousoufi, Afghan mountaineer
 Hanifa Mavlianova, Russian singer

See also 

 Hanife

Arabic feminine given names
Bosnian feminine given names